Jakob "Jacques" Person (1 May 1889 – 15 July 1915) was a German track and field athlete who competed in the 1912 Summer Olympics. In 1912 he was eliminated in the semi-finals of the 400 metres competition. In the 800 metres event he was eliminated in the first round.

He was killed in action during World War I.

See also
 List of Olympians killed in World War I

References

External links 
 

1889 births
1915 deaths
People from Saverne
People from Alsace-Lorraine
German male sprinters
German male middle-distance runners
Olympic athletes of Germany
Athletes (track and field) at the 1912 Summer Olympics
German military personnel killed in World War I
Sportspeople from Bas-Rhin